Ian Lindsay Slack-Smith MP (born 1946) is a former Australian politician, elected as a member of the New South Wales Legislative Assembly.

Slack-Smith was born in Narrabri and educated at The King's School, Sydney.  He is married with five children.  He represented Barwon for the National Party from 1995 to his retirement at the 2007 election.

Notes

 

Living people
National Party of Australia members of the Parliament of New South Wales
Members of the New South Wales Legislative Assembly
1946 births
21st-century Australian politicians